Genesis Wayne Potini  (5 September 1963 – 15 August 2011) was a New Zealand speed chess player.

Life and work 
Potini was a man of Māori descent. He was known for his skills as a speed (1 min.) chess player. Together with two friends, he formed a chess club (The Eastern Knights) where underprivileged children found a home base – and learned to play chess in the process.  The chess club was also involved with the Ngāti Porou heritage. Potini suffered from a bipolar disorder and was regularly admitted to hospital. Despite this he was able to stabilise his life and during his last decade make a strong contribution to his community. He died in 2011 and was buried at Taruheru Cemetery in Gisborne.

Documentary and feature film 
In 2003 director Jim Marbrook made a documentary film about Potini (Dark Horse). The film was awarded the 2005 Best New Zealand Feature Documentary. In 2014 James Napier Robertson presented his feature film The Dark Horse (starring Cliff Curtis).  The film won many awards, became a hit at the NZ box office, and was declared "one of the greatest New Zealand films ever made".

References

External links 
 Short film, and photographs of Potini during coaching sessions  (Chessbase.com)
 Inside Out - Genesis Potini at NZ On Screen 28-minute-long documentary from 2003.
 Potini at ChessGames.com
 Potini at 365Chess.com
 NZ Herald (July 2014) about the feature film The Dark Horse by James Napier Robertson
 The Big Idea (Sept. 2003) about the documentary film Dark Horse by Jim Marbrook

New Zealand chess players
New Zealand Māori sportspeople
People with bipolar disorder
1963 births
2011 deaths
Ngāti Porou people
Burials at Taruheru Cemetery
People from Gisborne, New Zealand